The Chitauri are a fictional race of extraterrestrial shapeshifters appearing in American comic books published by Marvel Comics, specifically in Ultimate Marvel. They were created by Mark Millar and Bryan Hitch for the Ultimate universe franchise in place of the existing Marvel Comics alien species, the Skrulls, which play a similar role in the franchise's mainstream continuity. Marvel later chose to distinguish between the Skrulls and Chitauri of the Ultimate universe. The race first appeared in Ultimates #8 (Nov 2002), and later had counterparts on Earth-616.

The species was also adapted to other media, most notably for films set in the Marvel Cinematic Universe.

Fictional species biography

Earth-1610
The race called Chitauri appeared as Ultimate Marvel's (Earth-1610) counterpart to the Skrulls. They are a shapeshifting alien species who have attempted to conquer the Earth, most notably during World War II and again in the early 21st century.

The Chitauri claim to be part of "the immune system of the Universe", wiping out disorder and free will wherever they find it. They seem to prefer to act behind the scenes, mimicking and influencing the social and military methods of the species they are currently infiltrating. For example, they aided the Nazis in their attempt at world conquest by providing them with the technology to create a nuclear bomb carried by an intercontinental ballistic missile. However, this attempt was thwarted by the prototype super-soldier codenamed Captain America. Through the entire conflict of World War II, the Chitauri were being driven out of their operations in Africa and Europe, even from their main Japanese training camps in Hiroshima and Nagasaki. Following the end of the war, the Chitauri withdrew to make new plans.

The next attempt at conquest was more subtle (at first), involving long-term methods of manipulation such as will-inhibiting drugs in many nations' water supplies, influencing the media, and R.F.I.D. (radio-frequency identification) microchips to be implanted in schoolchildren, among other means. The Chitauri also infiltrated S.H.I.E.L.D., particularly the Psi-Division which could telepathically ferret out Chitauri agents. However, S.H.I.E.L.D. was able to detect some of the low-ranking "drone" staff of the aliens, disguised as common office workers, and wiped them out in an assault led by Black Widow and Hawkeye.

The Chitauri planted false information through the compromised Psi-Division that led S.H.I.E.L.D. and the Ultimates into a trap on a small Micronesian island; due to the combined efforts of Iron Man and Thor, the Ultimates, Nick Fury and a handful of S.H.I.E.L.D. soldiers survived, but thousands of S.H.I.E.L.D. soldiers were killed and dozens of Helicarriers were destroyed.

The Chitauri then counterattacked by infiltrating the Triskelion and capturing The Wasp. The Chitauri leader (known only by his former Nazi identity as Herr Kleiser) took the Wasp to a hidden Chitauri base in Arizona. However, their location was given away when a fleet of damaged Chitauri starships suddenly entered Earth's atmosphere to hover above the formerly secret base, claiming that they were fleeing major defeats across the galaxy by their intergalactic enemies and that the remainder of their forces are forced to the "backwaters" of the Milky Way Galaxy (i.e. Earth's Solar System). Disregarding Herr Kleiser's long efforts, the Chitauri ordered him to destroy Earth and the Solar System with a doomsday bomb as part of a scorched-earth policy and retreat to the "lower fourth-dimension". The Ultimates and all available S.H.I.E.L.D. and military forces immediately converged on the alien fleet.

At the same time, Captain America battled his old enemy Kleiser, but was unable to defeat him alone. At Captain America's urging/mocking of Kleiser touching Betty Ross (Hulk's crush), the Hulk was able to beat, chop, and devour Kleiser. It is presently presumed that the combination of the Chitauri's series of intergalactic defeats and the destruction of the Chitauri fleet on Earth spelled the complete and total defeat of the alien race.

During the Chitauri-Kree War, an entire Chitauri (whose true forms resemble their Avengers counterparts) armada was fighting their enemies when they encountered Gah Lak Tus. When their ships were being heavily damaged by the entity, a rift in the fabric of reality brought a being from another universe, which called itself Galactus. Gah Lak Tus merged with the visitor, and created an even more powerful Galactus with need to feed.

Earth-616
A new iteration of the Chitauri (inspired by their portrayal in The Avengers film) first appeared in the mainstream Earth-616 continuity and unlike their Earth-1610 counterpart, they are a distinct species from the Skrulls. Most of them are simple-minded dogged creatures, similar to insects, to the point of following a queen.

The Chitauri first appeared as enemies of the new Nova. Nova was able to defeat an entire Chitauri armada and Titus with the Ultimate Nullifier that he stole from them in the first place. They are currently holding Nova's father Jesse as an hostage on a planet similar to Saturn.

The Chitauri have Jesse Alexander captive on their planet Chitauri Prime as one of the Chitauri's slaves that fight in their gladiatorial arena.

The Chitauri are revealed to have made a Chitauri clone of Jesse Alexander which also has Jesse's memories.

At the time when Captain America's memories were rewritten by Red Skull's clone using the powers of Kobik to be a Hydra agent, Red Skull's clone had Captain America steal some Chitauri eggs to lure the Chitauri to Earth so that they can raze it. The Alpha Flight Space Program had to fight the Chitauri swarms where they took out four different swarms in a month.

During the "Civil War II" storyline, a larger Chitauri swarm was defeated by Quasar where it was predicted that a much larger Chitauri swarm will appear that will be larger than the Annihilation Wave.

During the "Secret Empire" storyline, the Chitauri arrived at Earth where the Alpha Flight Space Program, the Ultimates, Quasar, and Hyperion of Earth-13034. As Hydra began its takeover, Captain America activated the Planetary Defense Shield trapping the Chitauri and those fighting them outside of Earth. As those trapped outside of Earth continue fighting the Chitauri, they are unable to convince the representatives on the Galactic Council into helping them against the Chitauri. As Spectrum tells Captain Marvel that they are able to make inter-dimensional supply runs and have found the location of the Chitauri Queen Eggs, the waves of Chitauri and their Leviathans are increasing in size and frequency leaving the technicians without enough time to fix the severe structural damage to the station. Monica suggests that America Chavez relocate the heroes and people stuck outside the Planetary Defense Shield to an alternate reality given the Intergalactic Council in their reality are unsympathetic to Earth's plight. Captain Marvel rejects this idea stating the heroes were charged with a mission to protect the Earth against the Chitauri invasion and they are the only thing standing in the way if the Planetary Defense Shield were to go down for some reason. Captain Marvel then turns her attention to a comatose Avril Kincaid who we find out did survive being swallowed by the Leviathan and was pulled out of the wreckage by Nova. Captain Marvel admits her fault in the situation and the raising of the Planetary Defense Shield and pleads for Avril to wake up because the team desperately needs the strength of her powers. After Quasar awakens from her coma thanks to Sam Wilson using the Cosmic Cube fragment he had to find a way to take down the Planetary Defense Shield, she takes down the Planetary Defense Shield allowing Captain Marvel to fly to the location of the Chitauri eggs which she destroys.

Known Chitauri

Earth-1610 version
 Califa  – A member of the Chitauri armada which were fighting the Kree.
 Gunther  – A sleeper agent who infiltrated into S.H.I.E.L.D.
 Herr Kleiser – A Chitauri who infiltrated Earth during World War II. He was shot in head and later eaten by the Hulk.
 Kalxor  – A member of the Chitauri armada which were fighting the Kree. His parents were killed by the Kree.
 Rester  – The commander of the Chitauri armada which were fighting the Kree.
 Siegfred  – A sleeper agent who infiltrated S.H.I.E.L.D..
 Wigbert  – A sleeper agent who infiltrated S.H.I.E.L.D..

Earth-616 version
 Warbringer  – A Chitauri Warlord kept in hibernation due to his brutal methods. He would go on fight Nova, the Avengers, Guardians of the Galaxy, and the Champions.

Powers and abilities
The Chitauri were able to mimic human form and absorb human knowledge, by sucking the organs or brains out of the humans they imitated. As seen in the scene from the first movie, where one pulls a military officer onto the roof of a building and stabbing the officer's gut and starts to suck something out. In their natural form, they appear to be large, and reptilian, but no clear images of their native form have been shown.

Inspiration
Millar's conception of the Chitauri was inspired by the British conspiracy theorist David Icke. Icke believes the world is secretly run by an elite called the Illuminati who are in reality shape-shifting reptilian humanoids. The term Chitauri to describe these shape-shifting reptilian humanoids gained notoriety from The Reptilian Agenda, where Zulu Shaman and historian, Credo Mutwa and David Icke reveal the story of the Chitauri (reptilian) takeover of planet Earth and how a shape-shifting Chitauri (“Talker”) race has controlled planet Earth for thousands of years. Essentially, the term Chitauri is the Shona term meaning “talker” in reference to the reptilians, as shown above in the two different meanings referenced in parentheses.

Comparison with Skrulls 
Another race called Skrulls, physically resembling the Skrulls of the mainstream Marvel universe, appear later (led by the billion-year-old Skrull Emperor, Kl'rt); these Skrulls dislike being confused with the Chitauri, whom they call terrorists. They have extremely advanced technology, but have not been observed to shapeshift. These Skrulls were seen only in an alternate timeline in which Reed Richards contacted their world via his teleporter. The events leading to that timeline were altered in Ultimate Fantastic Four #29, and contact was never made.

In other media

Television
 The Chitauri appear in Ultimate Spider-Man. This version of the species is led by Korvac and resemble their MCU portrayals (see below). In the episode "Guardians of the Galaxy", Rocket Raccoon allows himself to be captured by the Chitauri so he can rescue his teammates on the eponymous team. The Guardians later join forces with Spider-Man to foil Korvac's plot to invade Earth. In the episode "The Return of the Guardians of the Galaxy", Titus leads the Chitauri in an attempt to claim Nova's helmet, only to be foiled by the Guardians, Nova, and Spider-Man.
 The Chitauri appear in the Avengers Assemble episode "Avengers: Impossible". While working on a documentary about the Chitauri, the aliens attack and pursue Impossible Man, who temporarily escapes from them and heads to Earth to create a television series starring the Falcon and get his help in fighting off the Chitauri. After the aliens attack the Earth, Falcon and the Avengers fight them off before the former convinces Impossible Man to send the Chitauri away from Earth.
 The Chitauri appear in Lego Marvel Super Heroes: Maximum Overload, with vocal effects provided by Dee Bradley Baker. This version of the species are servants of Loki.
 The Chitauri appear in the Guardians of the Galaxy episode "The Backstabbers", with several of their kind serving Nebula.

Film
The Chitauri appear in the 2006 animated films Ultimate Avengers and Ultimate Avengers 2 as main enemies led by Herr Kleiser, voiced by Jim Ward. This version of the species resembles ten foot tall reptilian creatures with dark green skin and can generate fire blasts from their hands. While the species as a whole lacks the ability to shapeshift, only Chitauri super-soldier/apparent leader Kleiser retains the ability. In the second film, Kleiser and his Chitauri forces return seeking to destroy Wakanda, having killed T'Chaka, they are ultimately defeated by the Wakandians and Avengers and encased in Vibranium.

Marvel Cinematic Universe
The Chitauri appear in live-action media set in the Marvel Cinematic Universe (MCU). This version of the species are allied with Thanos through his vizier, a hooded being called the "Other" (portrayed by Alexis Denisof), lack the ability to shapeshift, and are presented as a race of grey reptilian humanoids with bio-mechanical physiology and superhuman attributes. Their technology ranges from hovercraft-like skimmers and Necrocraft, to living airborne troop carriers called Leviathans that are all neural linked with a mothership.
 The Chitauri first appear in the 2012 film The Avengers, where the Other, acting on Thanos' behalf, lends the Chitauri to Loki to invade Earth. While they eventually overwhelm the Avengers, Iron Man destroys the mothership with a hijacked nuclear missile, killing the invading forces.
 In the television series Agents of S.H.I.E.L.D., Hydra cell Project Centipede salvage Chitauri metal and utilize it in several of their devices throughout season one. In the pilot episode, the Chitauri appear via archive footage. Additionally, S.H.I.E.L.D. agent Grant Ward recovers a Chitauri neural link from an illegal arms dealer. In the episode "FZZT", it is revealed that several firefighters were sent to New York following the events of The Avengers. A group from Wrigley, Pennsylvania took a Chitauri helmet as a souvenir, unaware that it contained a rust-like alien virus that slowly killed anyone exposed to it. During the subsequent S.H.I.E.L.D. investigation, scientists Leo Fitz and Jemma Simmons recover the helmet and use DNA residue on it to create an antiserum to counteract the virus.
 The Other and a Chitauri soldier appear in the 2014 film Guardians of the Galaxy. The latter appears as a prisoner of the Collector while the former attends a meeting between Thanos and Ronan the Accuser, during which Ronan kills the Other for berating him.
 Chitauri technology appears in the 2015 film Avengers: Age of Ultron. A Hydra faction led by Baron Strucker study it until the Avengers discover his hidden lab. When Iron Man recovers the sceptre Loki used in the original Chitauri invasion, Wanda Maximoff causes him to hallucinate the Chitauri's return, which eventually leads him to create Ultron.
 In the Netflix series Luke Cage, Hammer Industries use salvaged Chitauri metal to create Judas bullets, shrapnel-like ammunition capable of piercing the titular character's bulletproof skin and wounding or even killing him. Willis Stryker uses them against Cage on several occasions and uses an alliance with Mariah Dillard to manipulate the NYPD into arming the Emergency Service Unit with mass-produced Judas bullets.
 Chitauri technology appears in the 2017 film Spider-Man: Homecoming. When Damage Control begins salvaging leftover technology from the aliens' original invasion, Adrian Toomes and his cohorts steal the technology from them to build powerful weapons as well as sell it on the black market until they are eventually foiled by Spider-Man.
 The Chitauri appear in the 2018 film Avengers: Infinity War, primarily serving as Thanos' enforcers in his mission to obtain the Infinity Stones. In a flashback, they invaded Gamora's home planet and slaughtered half of its populace on Thanos' orders.
 Past versions of the Chitauri appear in the 2019 film Avengers: Endgame. They arrive in the present to help Thanos thwart the Avengers' attempt to undo his victory in Infinity War, but Iron Man uses the Infinity Stones to disintegrate Thanos and his forces.

Video games
 The MCU version of the Chitauri appear as enemies in Lego Marvel's Avengers.
 The Chitauri appear in Marvel Avengers Academy.
 The Chitauri appear in Fortnite Battle Royale as part of the Avengers: Endgame tie-in event.
The Chitauri appear in Marvel's Guardians of the Galaxy.

Miscellaneous
The MCU version of the Chitauri appear in the Marvel Universe LIVE! arena show.

References

External links
 
 Chitauri at Marvel Cinematic Universe Wiki

Fictional mass murderers
Characters created by Mark Millar
Comics characters introduced in 2002
Ultimate Marvel characters
Fictional characters from parallel universes
Science fiction film characters
Fictional shapeshifters
Fictional humanoids
Fictional reptilians
Marvel Comics alien species
Marvel Comics characters who are shapeshifters
Marvel Comics extraterrestrial supervillains
Skrull